Calvizzano is a comune (municipality) in the Metropolitan City of Naples in the Italian region Campania, located about 9 km northwest of Naples.

Calvizzano borders the following municipalities: Marano di Napoli, Mugnano di Napoli, Qualiano, Villaricca.

References

Cities and towns in Campania